Steven Clark  (born December 14, 1962) is a former professional American football defensive back who played for the Buffalo Bills in 1987.

External links
Pro-Football-Reference

1962 births
Buffalo Bills players
Living people
American football defensive backs
Sportspeople from Arlington County, Virginia
Liberty Flames football players
Players of American football from Virginia